Mar Jain Bhi To Kya is a popular Pakistani Soap directed by Saif-e-Hassan and written by Iqbal Bano.

Cast

Main cast 
 Farhan Ali Agha as Raza Ali Khan
 Arij Fatyma as Salia 
 Syed Jibran as Irfan 
 Eshita Mehboob as Samina
 Jana Malik as Tara

Other credited cast 
 Anum Fayyaz as Zareen
 Asma Jahangir as Saida
 Kunwar Nafees as Nadir
 Saif-e-Hassan
 Sheirin Maqsood
 Afshan Qureshi as Phuppu Nadir's Mother
 Niaz Ali khan
 Naeem Sheikh
 Seema Sehar as Salia's Mother
 Nasar-ul-Allah Khan
 Paray Paleejo
 Esha Noor as Maria	
 Sania
 Ayesha Ali
 Salma Shaheen
 'Manoj
 Zakir Babar
 Ammad
 Marya Rehman
 Abbas
 Kanwal
 Murtaza

Child artist
 Muhammad Ali
 Mushk Mohyuddin
 Abdul Qadir 
 Zainab
 Hamza Mohyuddin
 Dania
 Shaizel

Soundtrack

The theme song Mar Jain Bhi To Kya was composed by Shaiby and sung by Saima Iqbal. It was written by Director Saif-e-Hassan.

See also
 Humsafar
 Qaid-e-Tanhai
 Shehr-e-Zaat

References

External links

2012 Pakistani television series debuts
Pakistani drama television series
Urdu-language television shows
Hum TV original programming
2013 Pakistani television series endings